John L. Williams (born November 23, 1964) is an American former professional football player who was a running back in the National Football League (NFL) for ten seasons during the 1980s and 1990s.  Williams played college football for the University of Florida.  A first-round pick in the 1986 NFL Draft, he played professionally for the Seattle Seahawks and the Pittsburgh Steelers of the NFL.

Early years 

Williams was born in Palatka, Florida in 1964.  He attended Palatka High School, where he was a standout high school football running back in the wishbone offense of the Palatka Panthers.  Williams rushed for 3,449 yards and fifty-nine touchdowns, including 1,738 yards as a senior.  The Panthers finished undefeated and won the Florida Class 3A championship.  In 2007, twenty-five years after he graduated from high school, the Florida High School Athletic Association (FHSAA) recognized Williams as one of the "100 Greatest Players of the First 100 Years" of Florida high school football.

College career 

Williams accepted an athletic scholarship to attend the University of Florida in Gainesville, Florida, where he was a fullback for coach Charley Pell and coach Galen Hall's Florida Gators football teams from 1982 to 1985.  Williams usually shared the backfield with tailback Neal Anderson, behind the blocking of the Gators' outstanding offensive line known as "The Great Wall of Florida."  The Gators finished with identical 9–1–1 records in 1984 and 1985, and best-in-the-conference records of 5–0–1 and 5–1.  Williams was recognized as a second-team All-Southeastern Conference (SEC) selection in 1984 and 1985, and an honorable mention All-American in 1985.  He finished his four-year college career with 2,409 yards rushing and 863 yards receiving.  Williams was inducted into the University of Florida Athletic Hall of Fame as a "Gator Great" in 1997.  In a 2006 article series written for The Gainesville Sun, the Sun sportswriters rated him as the No. 31 all-time Gator from among the 100 greatest players of the first century of Florida football.

Professional career 

He was selected to the Pro Bowl in 1990 and 1991.

During his ten-year professional career, Williams played in 149 regular season games, started in 135 of them, and had 1,245 carries for 5,005 yards and eighteen rushing touchdowns, and 546 receptions for 4,656 yards and nineteen receiving touchdowns.

NFL career statistics

See also 

 Florida Gators football, 1980–89
 List of Florida Gators in the NFL Draft
 List of Pittsburgh Steelers players
 List of Seattle Seahawks first-round draft picks
 List of Seattle Seahawks players
 List of University of Florida Athletic Hall of Fame members

References

Bibliography 

 Carlson, Norm, University of Florida Football Vault: The History of the Florida Gators, Whitman Publishing, LLC, Atlanta, Georgia (2007).  .
 Golenbock, Peter, Go Gators!  An Oral History of Florida's Pursuit of Gridiron Glory, Legends Publishing, LLC, St. Petersburg, Florida (2002).  .
 Hairston, Jack, Tales from the Gator Swamp: A Collection of the Greatest Gator Stories Ever Told, Sports Publishing, LLC, Champaign, Illinois (2002).  .
 McCarthy, Kevin M.,  Fightin' Gators: A History of University of Florida Football, Arcadia Publishing, Mount Pleasant, South Carolina (2000).  .
 Nash, Noel, ed., The Gainesville Sun Presents The Greatest Moments in Florida Gators Football, Sports Publishing, Inc., Champaign, Illinois (1998).  .

1964 births
Living people
American Conference Pro Bowl players
American football fullbacks
Florida Gators football players
People from Palatka, Florida
Pittsburgh Steelers players
Seattle Seahawks players